Tasos Vatikiotis (born March 20, 1977) is a former professional soccer player who played with Ethnikos Asteras Football Club, a 1st division professional team at the time (1998-1999), in Athens, Greece and USL's Delaware Wizards in (1997-1998), which was D.C. United's farm team at the time.  He played at the top 20 nationally ranked soccer program at Loyola University Maryland from 1994-1998. Prior to college, Vatikiotis played club ball with nationally ranked VISTA Blackwatch and Springfield Nationals where he led both clubs in scoring.  He finished the 1993-1994 season as the overall leading goal scorer for both the NCSL's Elite Division 1 League and Virginia's State Cup tournament, which is part of the US Youth Soccer National Championship Series.  Vatikiotis was coached, among others, by Michael Brady, Rob Olson, Peter Mehlert, Evangelos Stoyas and Alketas Panagoulias.  In his youth and high school days, he also trained and played under John Kerr, Sr., John Kerr, Jr. and Bruce Murray for DC based Fairfax Spartans that had recently won the National Amateur Cup.  His father also played an integral part in his overall training growing up.  Vatikiotis played attacking central midfield and forward.

- most recent from Washington Post (listed below in references under ) while at Loyola "George Mason (5-3) won for the fourth straight time and handed coach Gordon Bradley his 150th career win in 13 seasons. Loyola, which had been ranked among the nation's top 20 teams a week ago, dropped its second straight to fall to 2-2-2. Scott Thelen, Mark Vita and Eduardo Lima scored for the Patriots, while Tasos Vatikiotis scored for Loyola off an assist from Dan Mosny."

Youth
Vatikiotis was born in Fairfax, Virginia and grew up in his hometown Kallipoli, Piraeus in Greece, during his childhood years.  He moved to the Washington metropolitan area with his family in 1988.

References

External links

 NCAA Division 1 Men's Soccer Record Book (page 3)

1977 births
Living people
American soccer players
American soccer coaches
Loyola Greyhounds men's soccer players
Greek footballers
Sportspeople from Fairfax, Virginia
Association football midfielders
Association football forwards
A-League (1995–2004) players
Soccer players from Virginia
Super League Greece players
Footballers from Piraeus
USL First Division players
USISL players